Tanjong Pagar United Football Club is a professional football club that competes in the Singapore Premier League, the top division of football in Singapore. The club took part in S.League from 1996 to 2004, and from 2011 to 2014. The club withdrew from the league after the 2004 season because of financial problems, but returned in 2011, with several similar breaks meanwhile.

The club also has its women's section. The club has since returned from 2020 onwards.

History
Prior to the formation of the S.League, the team was known as Tiong Bahru Constituency Sports Club, and won Singapore's National Football League in 1983 and 1987. The club changed its name to Tiong Bahru United Football Club in 1996, and then to Tanjong Pagar United in 1998.

The team's mascot was a Jaguar. During its first run in the S.League, the club's home ground was the Queenstown Stadium. However, as the Queenstown Stadium was occupied since 2010 by French club Etoile FC, Tanjong Pagar United was based in Clementi Stadium for the duration of the 2011 season. However, due to Etoile FC's withdrawal from the S-League by the end of the 2011 season, Tanjong Pagar shifted back to Queenstown Stadium for the 2012 season.

The club were formed as Tiong Bahru Constituency Sports Club in 1975 and debuted in Division III of the National Football League, from which they were promoted as champions in 1978. This was followed by a second successive promotion in 1979, bringing the Jaguars to Division I. In 1982, they won the President's Cup and the following year, they were national league champions. They represented Singapore in the 1984 ASEAN Club Games, finishing third, then captured The Double in 1987. The early 1990s saw further successes, as they were Pools Cup winners in 1991 and 1993, finished runners-up in the FAS Premier League from 1991 to 1993 and bagged the FA Cup in 1994. Their strong performances led to their selection as one of eight clubs to compete in the newly formed S.League, so in 1995, they were renamed to Tiong Bahru Football Club and obtained a permanent home at the Queenstown Stadium.

In 2017, the owners of Tanjong Pagar United stated their intent to return to Singapore Premier League for the 2019 season, and in November 2017 applied to FAS to rejoin the league. On the same month, the team also appeals to continue their jackpot operations, which is the source of club's income, after new regulations by the Ministry of Home Affairs forced the club to wind down their operations. But after their appeals were rejected by Ministry of Home Affairs and were ordered to shut down their jackpot operations in April 2018, as of September 2019, there were no further updates from the club regarding this intent.

On 16 January 2020, the Football Association of Singapore confirms Tanjong Pagar United's participation in the 2020 Singapore Premier League season.

Seasons

 The 1996 season of the S.League was split into two series. Tiger Beer Series winners Geylang United defeated Pioneer Series winners Singapore Armed Forces in the Championship playoff to clinch the S.League title.
 2003 saw the introduction of penalty shoot-outs if a match ended in a draw in regular time. Winners of penalty shoot-outs gained two points instead of one.
 Tanjong Pagar United sat out the S.League from 2005 to 2010, and withdrew from the competition between 2015 - 2019.

Players

Current squad

U23

U23

U23

U23

U23

U21
U21
U21
U21

On Loan

 (National Service till 2023)
 (National Service till 2024)
 (National Service till 2025, to Young Lions FC)

Former players
  Reo Nishiguchi
  Shodai Nishikawa
  Luiz Júnior
  Yann Motta
  Takahiro Tanaka
  Monsef Zerka
  Takaya Kawanabe
  Dragan Talajić
  Wojciech Jagoda

Club officials

Management
Chairman: Raymond Tang
Vice-Chairman: Andrew Chua
Honorary Secretary: Zen Tay
Honorary Treasurer: Chan Kok Hock
Club Supervisor: Richard Woon

Technical staff
Manager: Hasrin Jailani
Assistant Manager: 
Goalkeeping Coach: Fajar Sarib
Fitness Coach: Hafiz Osman
Youth Coach: Jaslee Hatta
Forward Coach & Video Analyst: 
Head of first team football: Noh Alam Shah

Managers
 PN Sivaji
 Robert Alberts (1996–98)
 Tohari Paijan (1998–2002)
 Moey Yok Ham (2003–04)
 Karim Bencherifa (2004)
 Terry Pathmanathan (2011–2012)
 Patrick Vallée (2012–2014)
 Hairil Suap (2020)
 Hasrin Jailani (2020–Present)

Honours

Domestic
League
 National Football League Division One: 2
 1983, 1987

Cups
 Singapore Cup: 1
 1998
 Singapore FA Cup: 1
 1998
 President's Cup: 4
 1982, 1985, 1987, 1994

Sponsors

References

External links
 Official club website
 Official club Facebook site
 Official club Twitter site
 S.League website page on Tanjong Pagar United FC 

 
Football clubs in Singapore
1974 establishments in Singapore
Singapore Premier League clubs